Laslo Babits (April 17, 1958 in Oliver, British Columbia – June 12, 2013) was a male javelin thrower from Canada. He competed for his native country at the 1984 Summer Olympics in Los Angeles, California, finishing in 8th place. He set his personal best (86.90 metres) in 1984.

Achievements

Personal life
Laslo graduated from Southern Okanagan Secondary School in 1977.

References

External links
 
 
 
 
 

1958 births
2013 deaths
Canadian male javelin throwers
Athletes (track and field) at the 1984 Summer Olympics
Athletes (track and field) at the 1983 Pan American Games
Athletes (track and field) at the 1982 Commonwealth Games
Commonwealth Games silver medallists for Canada
Olympic track and field athletes of Canada
Sportspeople from British Columbia
People from Oliver, British Columbia
Commonwealth Games medallists in athletics
Pan American Games medalists in athletics (track and field)
Pan American Games gold medalists for Canada
World Athletics Championships athletes for Canada
Medalists at the 1983 Pan American Games
20th-century Canadian people
Medallists at the 1982 Commonwealth Games